Alokolum is a town in Gulu District in the Northern Region of Uganda. It is home to a seminary, Alokolum Major Seminary.

References

Populated places in Uganda
Gulu District